Chinna Pasanga Naanga is a 1992 Indian Tamil language drama film directed by Raj Kapoor. The film stars Murali, Revathi and Saradha Preetha. It was released on 1 May 1992.

Plot
Muthukaalai, an angry young man, returns to his village after studying in the city. Ambalam is a respected panchayat headman since his brother married a woman from another caste, he hates their family. Poochandu, Ambalam's niece, falls in love with Muthukaalai. Meanwhile, Muthukaalai's cousin Marikolunthu who is crazy about Muthukaalai comes from her village to marry him. One day, the storm devastates the entire village, destroying the poor villagers' house. The villagers beg Ambalam to let them in the temple until the storm calms down but Ambalam refuses. Poochandu's mother breaks the temple's padlock to save the villagers. The next day, at the village panchayat, Ambalam condemn Poochandu's mother to tonsure and Poochandu to become a Devadasi. In anger against this dictatorship, Muthukaalai ridicules Ambalam and he marries Poochandu. What transpires next forms the rest of the story.

Cast

Murali as Muthukaalai
Revathi as Marikolunthu
Saradha Preetha as Poochandu
R. P. Viswam as Ambalam
Goundamani as 'Kuwait' Govind
Senthil
Vadivukkarasi
Sangita
Charle as Manikkam
Kumarimuthu as Kannayiram
K. K. Soundar as Kaalimuthu
Kovai Senthil as Vellaisamy
Super Subbarayan
Master Haja Sheriff
King Kong
Vaani
Sivaram Gandhi
Boopathi Raja
Venkatesh
Sivaraman
Marthandan
Chelladurai

Soundtrack

The film score and the soundtrack were composed by Ilaiyaraaja. The soundtrack, released in 1992, features 6 tracks with lyrics written by Vaali and Gangai Amaran.

Reception
The film completed a 100-day run at the box-office.

References

External links

1992 films
Films scored by Ilaiyaraaja
1990s Tamil-language films
Films directed by Raj Kapoor (Tamil film director)